An Evening River Landscape with a Ferry (other title: River Landscape) is a 1643 painting by the Dutch painter Jan van Goyen. The painting was bought in 1890 in Paris by Wilhelm von Bode. It is now in the Musée des Beaux-Arts of Strasbourg, France. Its inventory number is 221.

Not without pride, the 2009 catalogue of the Flemish and Dutch paintings of the Musée des Beaux-Arts calls Van Goyen's painting "indisputably one of the most beautiful landscape paintings of the Dutch school" (sans conteste l′un des plus beaux paysages de la peinture hollandaise).

References

Paintings in the collection of the Musée des Beaux-Arts de Strasbourg
1643 paintings
Paintings by Jan van Goyen
Landscape paintings